This page covers all the important events in the sport of tennis in 2021. It provides the results of notable tournaments throughout the year on both the ATP and WTA Tours, the Davis Cup, and the Fed Cup.

The Covid-19 pandemic hugely impacted on the 2021 professional tennis tour.

ITF

Grand Slam events

IOC

2020 Summer Olympics

24 July – 1 August 2021: Summer Olympics

References

External links
Official website of the Association of Tennis Professionals (ATP)
Official website of the Women's Tennis Association (WTA)
Official website of the International Tennis Federation (ITF)
Official website of the International Team Competition in Men's Tennis (Davis Cup)
Official website of the International Team Competition in Women's Tennis (Fed Cup)

 
Tennis by year